Theo Thomas Young (born April 25, 1965) is a former professional American football tight end and current National Football League (NFL) college football scout.

Playing career
Young played college football for the University of Arkansas Razorbacks, where he earned a degree in Sociology, and was drafted by the Pittsburgh Steelers in the 12th round of the 1987 NFL Draft.

Young played one season in the National Football League for the Pittsburgh Steelers. He caught 2 passes for 10 yards in 12 games in 1987.

Coaching career
Following his professional career, Young moved into the coaching ranks, serving as an assistant at the University of Tennessee at Chattanooga, and Clemson University, where he was hired by his former college coach, Ken Hatfield. He spent twelve years coaching for the Rice University Owls, remaining an assistant on Hatfield's staff. Young joined the staff of Baylor University as defensive ends coach in 2008. On January 12, 2011, Baylor announced that Young was among several coaches being let go under new defensive coordinator, Phil Bennett.

It was announced in June 2011, that Young joined the college scouting staff of the Buffalo Bills NFL team, where he participated in the NFL Minority Coaching Fellowship program in 1996. His primary scouting region includes Kansas, Missouri, Iowa, Nebraska, Minnesota and the Dakotas.

External links
 Theo Young Profile - Baylor Bears Official Athletic Site - BaylorBears.com
 Theo Young, TE at NFL.com

References

1965 births
Living people
People from Newport, Arkansas
American football tight ends
Arkansas Razorbacks football players
Pittsburgh Steelers players
Arkansas Razorbacks football coaches
Chattanooga Mocs football coaches
Clemson Tigers football coaches
Rice Owls football coaches
Baylor Bears football coaches